Ratnagiri railway division is one of the two railway divisions under Konkan Railway of Indian Railways. This railway division was formed on 26 January 1998 and its headquarter is located at Ratnagiri in the state of Maharashtra of India.

Ratnagiri railway division is another railway division under Konkan Railway headquartered at Mumbai. The Ratnagiri railway region extends over 480 kilometres (300 mi) from Roha to Sawantwadi in Maharashtra. Ratnagiri railway region is headed by a Regional Railway Manager.

List of railway stations and towns 
The list includes the stations under the Ratnagiri railway division and their station category.

References

 
Divisions of Konkan Railway
Divisions of Indian Railways
1998 establishments in Maharashtra